St. Louis College (Portuguese: Colégio São Luís), is a Brazilian Catholic school located in the city of São Paulo. It was founded by the Jesuits in 1867. The school has classes from kindergarten through high school. St. Louis College's business school ceased operations in 2009, and students were transferred to Centro Universitário da FEI and Pontifical Catholic University of São Paulo.

History
St. Louis College was the second college founded in Brazil by the Society of Jesus after the society's suppression. Jesuit priests founded the school in Itu, São Paulo state, in 1867. In 1917, it was moved to the city of São Paulo.

In 1943, the school opened an evening business school providing graduate business courses, accommodating over 2500 students from private and public schools, many of whom were professionals in finance working nearby. As a Jesuit institution, the school helped new students by providing financial aid. In 1948, one of the first economics schools in the city was opened, then moved to the Jesuit Centro Universitário da FEI and Pontifical Catholic University of São Paulo.

In 1972, the school began receiving girls, a novelty among São Paulo schools at the time.

The late 1990s saw the construction of Saint Aloysius Gonzaga Church next to the school, along with more classrooms and the extension of classes to kindergarten.

Notable alumni

 Amyr Klink – explorer and sailor 
 Ayrton Senna – racing driver
 Eduardo Suplicy – academic, economist and politician
 Maria Fernanda Cândido – actress and model 
 Paulo Maluf – politician

See also

 Catholic Church in Brazil
 Education in Brazil
 List of Jesuit sites
 List of schools in Brazil

References

External links
 , the school's official website (in Portuguese)

1867 establishments in Brazil
Boys' schools in Brazil
Educational institutions established in 1867
Itu, São Paulo
Jesuit schools in Brazil
Mixed-sex education
Catholic primary schools in Brazil
Catholic secondary schools in Brazil
Schools in São Paulo